The Fort Hamilton Parkway station is a local station on the BMT Sea Beach Line of the New York City Subway, located in Borough Park, Brooklyn at the intersection of Fort Hamilton Parkway and 62nd Street. It is served by the N train at all times. During rush hours, several W and northbound Q trains also serve the station.

Station layout

This open-cut station opened on June 22, 1915. It has four tracks and two side platforms, but the two center express tracks are not normally used. The northbound platform has metal canopies while the southbound platform has beige concrete walls, columns, and roof (prior to renovation, the columns were blue-green).

At this point, the LIRR Bay Ridge Branch runs alongside north of the line.

From January 18, 2016 to May 22, 2017, the Manhattan-bound platform at this station was closed for renovations. The Coney Island-bound platform was closed for a much longer period of time, from July 31, 2017 to July 1, 2019.

Exits
Each end has a crossover. The full-time west exit leads to Fort Hamilton Parkway and 62nd Street while the HEET east exit leads to 11th Avenue and 62nd–63rd Streets. The distance between 11th Avenue and Fort Hamilton Parkway makes the platforms much longer than a typical "B" Division train. The station house's construction is stucco with tile interior.

Notes

References

External links 

 
 Station Reporter — N Train
 The Subway Nut — Fort Hamilton Parkway Pictures
 Fort Hamilton Parkway entrance from Google Maps Street View
 11th Avenue entrance from Google Maps Street View
Uptown Platform from Google Maps Street View

BMT Sea Beach Line stations
New York City Subway stations in Brooklyn
Railway stations in the United States opened in 1915
1915 establishments in New York City
Sunset Park, Brooklyn
Bensonhurst, Brooklyn